Hamza Ali Al-Khateeb (October 24, 1997 – May 25, 2011) was a 13-year-old Syrian boy who died while in the custody of the Syrian government in Daraa. On April 29, 2011, he was detained during a protest.  On May 25, 2011, his body was delivered to his family, having been badly bruised, along with burn marks, three gunshot wounds, and 
severed genitals.  Hamza's family distributed photos and video of his body to journalists and activists.  Shocked by what was depicted, thousands of people showed their support for Hamza online and in street protests.

Background 

Hamza lived with his parents in the village of al-Jeezah in Daraa Governorate.  He enjoyed watching his homing pigeons fly above his house since drought had left him unable to enjoy swimming.  He had a reputation for being generous.  "He would often ask his parents for money to give to the poor. I remember once he wanted to give someone 100 Syrian Pounds ($2), and his family said it was too much. But Hamza said, 'I have a bed and food while that guy has nothing.' And so he persuaded his parents to give the poor man the 100," his cousin told Al Jazeera.

Torture
Al-Jazeera reported that he was not interested in politics, according to an unnamed cousin, but on April 29, 2011, he joined his family in a rally to break the siege of the city of Daraa. "Everybody seemed to be going to the protest, so he went along as well," said his cousin. Hamza walked with friends and family 12 km along the road from al-Jeezah north-west to Saida. Firing began almost as the protesters reached Saida. Hamza's cousin reported: "People were killed and wounded, some were arrested. It was chaotic we didn't know at that point what had happened to Hamza. He just disappeared."  One source says that Hamza had been among 51 protesters detained by Air Force Intelligence, which detainees allegedly described as having a reputation for brutal torture.

Mutilation

A video of his body filmed several days after his death showed numerous injuries, including broken bones, gunshot wounds, burn marks, and mutilated genitals.  The Globe and Mail summarized: "His jaw and both kneecaps had been smashed. His flesh was covered with cigarette burns. His penis had been cut off. Other injuries appeared to be consistent with the use of electroshock devices and being whipped with a cable."

Following the broadcast, by Al Jazeera, of a video showing Hamza's body there was widespread outrage, both online and amongst the protesters in Syria.

In response to Al Jazeera's story, the chief of Syria regime’s medical examiners association, denied that Hamza was tortured.

Backlash and impact 

Hamza's name became a rallying cry for protesters. A Facebook page honouring him had more than 105,000 followers by May 2011. Following the pattern of demonstrators calling Fridays a "day of rage", Saturdays in Syria were called the "day of Hamza".

On May 31, 2011, U.S. Secretary of State Hillary Clinton marked his death as a turning point in the Syrian uprising, indicating that it "symbolises for many Syrians ... the total collapse of any effort by the Syrian government to work with and listen to their own people".

On March 14, 2012, The Guardian released 3,000 emails leaked from Asma al-Assad, Bashar al-Assad's wife, and her father, Fawas Akhras. Akhras had emailed Bashar al-Assad, instructing him to respond to allegations that children are tortured in Syria by dismissing it as "British propaganda".

See also 
 Death of Khaled Mohamed Saeed
 Death of Ali Jawad al-Sheikh
 Death of Ali Abdulhadi Mushaima
 Death of Ahmed Jaber al-Qattan
 Death of Alan Kurdi
 Mohamed Bouazizi
 Omran Daqneesh

General
List of kidnappings
List of solved missing person cases

References

External links 
 
 
 AlJazeera coverage of support protests for Hamza
 CNN's AC360 incident segment
 CNN's John Roberts review
 CNN segment on protest response

1997 births
2010s missing person cases
2011 murders in Syria
2011 deaths
Castrated people
Deaths by person in Syria
Formerly missing people
Incidents of violence against boys
Kidnapped children
May 2011 crimes
May 2011 events in Syria
Male murder victims
Missing person cases in Syria
Murdered Syrian children
People from Daraa District
People of the Syrian civil war
Protest-related deaths
Syrian torture victims